Walem may refer to:

 Walem, Belgium, village in the municipality of Mechelen
 Walem, Netherlands, hamlet near Valkenburg in Limburg
 Johan Walem, football player